Hermes is the annual literary journal published by the University of Sydney Union.  It is the oldest such journal in Australasia.

History
Hermes was established in 1886. The first issue of Hermes appeared in July 1886.  Publication was suspended in 1942–1944, 1953, 1955, 1964, and 1970–1984. Hermes is edited by current students and all content within the publication is provided by students, staff and alumni from the University of Sydney. While in recent years there have been themes for specific editions, the journal publishes written, creative and visual pieces. A special jubilee edition was published in 1902 to coincide with the University's anniversary.

Today, Hermes acts as the printed Creative Catalogue for the USU Creative Awards. Each year winners of The USU Creative Awards have their work published in Hermes, win prize money and have their works displayed professionally at the Verge Gallery.

Past editors
Distinguished former editors of Hermes have included Thomas Bavin (1897), H. V. Evatt (1916), John Le Gay Brereton (1892-94), Clive Evatt (1926), James McAuley (1937), Jock Marshall (1941), and a duo of  Les Murray and Geoffrey Lehmann in 1962. Kathleen M. Commins was the first woman editor in 1931. In 2015 the Editorial team was entirely women: Elle Burchell, Pheobe Corleone, Madeleine Gray and Tahlia Chloe.

Editors 1886-2017

References

Further reading
 Barcan, A Student activists at Sydney University 1960-1967 Australian and New Zealand History of Education Society (ANZHES), January 2007. The retired education professor Alan Barcan published his personal view of activism at Sydney University during the 1960s, including references to the student publications Honi Soit, Hermes and Arna

External links
 Hermes : an undergraduate's magazine, digitised collection from 1886 -1990, University of Sydney Library, and illustrated covers of same

1886 establishments in Australia
Annual magazines published in Australia
Literary magazines published in Australia
Magazines established in 1886
Magazines published in Sydney
University of Sydney
Student magazines